Newton Phelps Stallknecht (October 24, 1906 – May 23, 1981) was an American philosopher and a professor of philosophy at the Indiana University.  He was a president of the Metaphysical Society of America.  Stallknecht was educated at Princeton University, achieving his A.B. in 1927, A.M. in 1928, and Ph.D. in 1930.  During World War II, he was attached to the United States Army Security Agency in Washington.  His publications cover both philosophy and comparative literature, with a philosophical focus on Immanuel Kant, Henri Bergson, and Alfred North Whitehead.

References

1906 births
1981 deaths
20th-century American philosophers
Philosophy academics
People from East Orange, New Jersey
Presidents of the Metaphysical Society of America
Princeton University alumni
Indiana University alumni
Comparative literature academics